John Heffernan may refer to:

 John Heffernan (American actor) (1934–2018), American actor
 John Heffernan (British actor) (born 1981), British actor
 John Heffernan (hurler) (born 1963), Irish hurler
 John Heffernan, co-writer of Snakes on a Plane